Christos Belevonis (born 29 July 2002) is a Greek professional footballer who plays as a forward for Super League 2 club Veria, on loan from Panetolikos.

References

2002 births
Living people
Greece youth international footballers
Super League Greece players
Football League (Greece) players
Super League Greece 2 players
Panetolikos F.C. players
Episkopi F.C. players
A.E. Karaiskakis F.C. players
Veria NFC players
Association football forwards
Footballers from Heraklion
Greek footballers